Richwater Films was a British film production and financing company and distributor, launched in 2013 by Jonathan Sothcott, which specialised in crime, thriller and action films.

History
The company was launched in 2013 and the first film that it produced was Vendetta starring Danny Dyer, Vincent Regan and Bruce Payne. It later produced Top Dog (2014) directed by Martin Kemp and starring Leo Gregory, We Still Kill the Old Way (2014), Age of Kill (2014) and Renegades (2014).

In April 2015, Richwater Films announced that it had teamed up with WWE Studios to co-produce and co-finance two action-thrillers, Eliminators and Rampage.

Filmography

References 

Film production companies of the United Kingdom
Defunct companies based in London
Mass media companies of England
Mass media companies established in 2013
Mass media companies disestablished in 2016